Hypocala guttiventris is a species of moth of the family Erebidae. It is found in Queensland and New South Wales.

The wingspan is about 30 mm. Adults have brown forewings with a curved pale band along the inner margin. The hindwings are yellow with brown markings. There is a broad brown band running along the margin. They pierce fruit to suck the juice.

References

Erebidae